"Yeah Yeah Yeah Yeah Yeah" is a single by The Pogues. It stalled just outside the UK Top 40 at number 43, but became the band's first single to chart in the USA, reaching number 17 in the Modern Rock Charts. The video was based on an episode of Top of the Pops from the 1960s, showing a differing of styles from the innocence of the early 1960s to the psychedelica of the late 1960s. An EP of the same name was released in September 1990 and contained some of The Pogues' most rock-oriented material, including a cover of "Honky Tonk Women" by The Rolling Stones.

Track listing

UK 12"
 "Yeah, Yeah, Yeah, Yeah, Yeah" - 3:16
 "The Limerick Rake" - 3:10
 "Honky Tonk Women" - 2:55
 "Yeah, Yeah, Yeah, Yeah, Yeah (Long Version)" - 6:43

US CD
 "Yeah, Yeah, Yeah, Yeah, Yeah" - 3:16
 "Honky Tonk Women" - 2:55
 "Jack's Heroes" - 3:05 (misspelled "Jack's Hero's" on the album cover and CD)
 "Whiskey in the Jar (Long Version)" - 4:15

References

1988 singles
1988 songs
1990 EPs
Island Records EPs
The Pogues albums
The Pogues songs
Songs written by Shane MacGowan
Song recordings produced by Steve Lillywhite